The 1937 Western Reserve Red Cats football team represented Western Reserve University, now known as Case Western Reserve University, during the 1937 college football seasonThe team was led by third-year head coach Bill Edwards, assisted by Roy A. "Dugan" Miller.  Notable players included Frank "Doc" Kelker, Phil Ragazzo, Albie Litwak, Mike Rodak, and Johnny Wilson.

The Red Cats went undefeated while at home. The loss to Dayton on October 30 ended a 28-game unbeaten streak stretching back to the 1934 season.

Schedule

References

Western Reserve
Case Western Reserve Spartans football seasons
Western Reserve Red Cats football